David Allen Meltzer (born October 24, 1959) is an American journalist and sports historian who reports on professional wrestling and mixed martial arts. He is also a frequent lecturer on many aspects of the business of MMA, professional wrestling, and boxing at the Graduate School of Business, Stanford University.

Since 1983, Meltzer has been the publisher and editor of the Wrestling Observer Newsletter (WON). He has also written for the Oakland Tribune, the Los Angeles Times, Yahoo! Sports, SI.com, and The National Sports Daily. He has extensively covered mixed martial arts since UFC 1 in 1993 and also covers the sport for SB Nation. He has been called "the most accomplished reporter in sports journalism" by Frank Deford of Sports Illustrated.

Early life 
Meltzer lived in upstate New York, later moving with his family to San Jose, California. 

Meltzer earned a journalism degree from San Jose State University and started out as a sportswriter for the Wichita Falls Times Record News and the Turlock Journal. He demonstrated an interest in professional wrestling and a journalistic approach to it early in life. Meltzer wrote several wrestling-related publications that predate WON, dating back to 1971. The most notable of these was the California Wrestling Report, ca. 1973–1974, which reported on the still-extant National Wrestling Alliance territories operating out of Los Angeles and San Francisco.

Wrestling Observer 

The beginnings of the Wrestling Observer Newsletter date back to 1980, when Meltzer began an annual poll amongst those with whom he corresponded regarding professional wrestling. According to Meltzer, he was just a fan at first. A short time later, he began maintaining a tape-trading list, and would occasionally send match results and news updates along with tape updates. Meltzer stated that he wanted to keep his friends in college "in the loop" for his tape trading and the happenings in the business, as the mainstream wrestling magazines catered to a somewhat younger demographic.

Star rating system and impact 

Meltzer popularized the star rating system (devised by Jim Cornette and his childhood friend Norm M. Dooley), which rates matches on a scale of zero to five stars (sometimes going to negative five stars in the case of very bad matches) in a similar manner to that used by many movie critics. Meltzer has also given ratings that have exceeded five stars. The first 6 and 6.5 star matches took place in 1981 (as rated by Dooley, not Meltzer). The highest he has ever rated a match was seven stars, given to Kazuchika Okada and Kenny Omega for their match at Dominion 6.9 in Osaka-jo Hall in June 2018. Wrestlers such as Bret Hart have written how proud they were when their performances were praised in the WON.

PWInsider's Dave Scherer pointed that Meltzer it's a "pioneer in wrestling reporting" since he had success reporting real life and behind the scenes events.

Controversies 

In January 2023, Meltzer was accused of publishing a hoax story involving Dragon Gate wrestler, Nosawa Rongai. Meltzer later apologized for the incident.

Awards and accomplishments 
Cauliflower Alley Club
James Melby Historian Award (2017)
 George Tragos/Lou Thesz Professional Wrestling Hall of Fame
 Jim Melby Award (2016)

Bibliography 
 Tributes: Remembering Some of the World's Greatest Wrestlers (Winding Stair Press, 2001, Hardcover)  
 Tributes II: Remembering More of the World's Greatest Wrestlers (Sports Publishing, 2004, Hardcover)

References

Further reading 
 
 Pick My Brain interview with Dave Meltzer
 DeathValleyDriver interview with Meltzer
 Dean S Planet interview with Meltzer

External links 
 Home of the Wrestling Observer Live radio show
 Official website of the Wrestling Observer

1959 births
20th-century American male writers
21st-century American male writers
American male journalists
American podcasters
Journalists from California
Living people
Professional wrestling historians
Professional wrestling journalists and columnists
Professional wrestling podcasters
San Jose State University alumni
Wrestling Observer Newsletter
Writers from San Jose, California